Irfan ur Rahman Khan also known as Irfan Khan  is an Indian politician of Indian National Congress from Parbhani, Maharashtra, he was Secretary of Maharashtra Pradesh Congress Committee, and served as Vice President of Maharashtra Pradesh Youth Congress Committee from 1989 to 2004.

Early life and education 
Irfan ur Rahman Khan born in a Khan family on 9 February 1960 to Abdul Rahman Khan and Rasheeda Rahman in Parbhani, Maharashtra, India. His father was a senior Indian National Congress leader and a MLA and MLC from Parbhani. His mother was a principal in a Government Urdu School. He is third amongst six children of his parents having three sisters and two brothers, he obtained his BSc, MSc, BEd and LLB degrees from Marathwada University of Aurangabad.

Personal life 
Khan married his cousin in 1986 who is a school principal. They have four children, three sons and one daughter.

Political career 
Khan started his political career as a Youth Congress member in 1978 and become secretary of Parbhani district Youth Congress in 1983. He served as a member of Parbhani Municipal Council from 1986 to 1991. Later, he became Vice President of Maharashtra Pradesh Youth Congress Committee and Secretary of Maharashtra Pradesh Congress Committee from 1989 to 2004 and 2011–2016 respectively. he contested Maharashtra Assembly elections as INC candidate from Parbhani in 2014. He along with his family runs various NGOs like Abdul Rehman Khan Charitable Trust, Inayat Education Society, Yusoufiya Educational, Cultural and Welfare Society & Inayat Ul Uloom working in education, public health and social sectors.

Positions held 
 Secretary – Parbhani District Youth Congress in 1983.
 Member – erstwhile Parbhani Municipal Council, 1986–1991.
 Chairman – District Minority Cell, 1987–1998.
 Chairman – Sanjay Gandhi Niradhar Yojana Parbhani, 1988–1994.
 Vice President – Maharashtra Pradesh Youth Congress Committee, 1989–2004.
 Member – Maharashtra State Haj Committee, 1999–2002.
 Vice President – Parbhani District Congress Committee, 2006–2010.
 Member – District Minority Welfare Committee Parbhani, 2006–2010.
 Secretary – Maharashtra Pradesh Congress Committee, 2011–2016.
 Member – Central Hindi Advisory Committee (Union Ministry of Tourism & Aviation).
 Member – Marathwada Wakf Board (twice).

References 

1960 births
Indian Muslims
Indian National Congress politicians
Muslim politics in India
Maharashtra municipal councillors
People from Parbhani district
People from Marathwada
Living people
People from Parbhani